The J. Ball House is a historic house located at Berkshire in Tioga County, New York.

Description and history 
It is a vernacular Greek Revival style frame house built in about 1850. It consists of a two-story, three-bay wide, gable roofed main section with a one-story, two bay side ell. The siding of the house is clapboard. Also on the property is a large gambrel roofed dairy barn.

Additions of a 20th-century front and rear porches have been made as well as a modern chimney. Foundation has been rebuilt.

The house was owned in 1855 by J. Ball, son of Isaac Ball, who is believed to have settled at this site in 1808. It was listed on the National Register of Historic Places on July 2, 1984.

References

Houses on the National Register of Historic Places in New York (state)
Greek Revival houses in New York (state)
Houses completed in 1850
Houses in Tioga County, New York
Wooden houses in the United States
National Register of Historic Places in Tioga County, New York